John Chaney (January 12, 1790 – April 10, 1881) was a U.S. Representative from Ohio for three terms from 1833 to 1839.

Biography
Born in Washington County, Maryland, the son of Susanna and Nathan Cheney, Chaney moved with his parents to Pennsylvania. He received a limited schooling.
He moved to Ohio in 1810 and settled in Bloom Township, Fairfield County, Ohio.
He engaged in agricultural pursuits.
Chaney married Mary Ann LaFere of Bloom Township in 1816. 
He was in the Justice of the Peace in 1821, 1824, and 1827.
Trustee of Bloom Township for twenty-three years.
Major, colonel, and paymaster in the Ohio State Militia.
He served as member of the State house of representatives 1828-1830.

Chaney was elected associate judge of Fairfield County in 1831.
Ohio Presidential elector in 1832 for Andrew Jackson.
Chaney was elected as a Jacksonian to the Twenty-third and Twenty-fourth Congresses and as a Democrat to the Twenty-fifth Congress (March 4, 1833 – March 3, 1839).
He returned to Ohio and settled in Canal Winchester, Franklin County.
He was again a member of the Ohio House of Representatives in 1842 and served as speaker.
He served as member of the village council.
He served in the Ohio State Senate in 1844 and 1845.
He was again a member of the state house of representatives in 1855.
He served as a delegate to the Ohio constitutional convention in 1851.

Death
He died at Canal Winchester, Ohio, April 10, 1881.
He was interred in Union Grove Cemetery.

John Chaney was the great-grandfather of the famous actor Lon Chaney, and the great-great-grandfather of Lon Chaney's son, Lon Chaney Jr.

Sources

1790 births
1881 deaths
People from Washington County, Maryland
People from Fairfield County, Ohio
People from Franklin County, Ohio
Ohio Constitutional Convention (1850)
Democratic Party Ohio state senators
Speakers of the Ohio House of Representatives
1832 United States presidential electors
Democratic Party members of the United States House of Representatives from Ohio
American militia officers
Jacksonian members of the United States House of Representatives from Ohio
19th-century American politicians
Democratic Party members of the Ohio House of Representatives
People from Canal Winchester, Ohio